In physical rehabilitation and sports training, the SAID principle asserts that the human body adapts specifically to imposed demands. It demonstrates that, given stressors on the human system, whether biomechanical or neurological, there will be a Specific Adaptation to Imposed Demands (SAID). For example, by only doing pull-ups on the same regular pull-up bar, the body becomes adapted to this specific physical demand, but not necessarily to other climbing patterns or environments.

In 1958, Berkeley Professor of Physical Education Franklin M. Henry proposed the "Specificity Hypothesis of Motor Learning".

Progression
 start basic/simple then move to advance/complex
 slow to fast
 low force to high force
 short distance to long distance
 bilaterally to unilaterally
 gradually use the Overload Principle.

See also
 Strength training
 Supercompensation
 Cybernetics
Velocity Based Training (VBT)

References

Physical therapy